Miss Grand Spain 2023 (Spanish: Miss Grand España 2023) will be the seventh edition of the Miss Grand Spain beauty pageant. The event was scheduled to be held on March 25, 2023, at Centro Comercial Martiánez Shopping Mall in the tourism coastline city of the Province of Santa Cruz de Tenerife, Puerto de la Cruz, for the third year in a row, with the Canary Islands hosting the competition. The winner of the contest will represent the country at Miss Grand International 2023.

Background

Location and date
On the grand final night of Miss Grand Spain 2022 contest, in addition to crowning the winner, the host of the event also announced that Puerto de la Cruz of the Santa Cruz de Tenerife will be served as the grand final venue of its succeeding edition, Miss Grand Spain 2023. A day after the 2022 coronation night, the president of Miss Grand Spain "Vicente Gonzalez" together with the vice-president of Miss Grand International Ltd. "Teresa Chaivisut" as well as  Nguyễn Thúc Thùy Tiên visit His Excellency Mayor of the City Council of Puerto de la Cruz "Marco Antonio Mesa" and the Councilor for Tourism Promotion, Roberto Medina, at the Costa Martiánez Tourist Complex to sign a memorandum of understanding (MOU) for hosting Miss Grand Spain 2023 in the city in March 2023.

Sponshorships

Selection of contestants

Overview
The national finalists for Miss Grand Spain 2023 were determined by provincial licensees through their regional pageants, where in some cases the qualifiers for the national stage are more than one person per event. As of February 2023, 33 province and autonomous community representatives had confirmed to participate, 27 of which directly obtained the regional title at the subnational pageant, while six candidates were appointed to the position after finishing as the runners-up at the regional contest, including the representatives of Atlántico, Barcelona, Las Palmas, Costa Canaria, Navarre, and Islas Afortunadas.

Of the appointed contestants,  two were assigned as the replacements for the original ones, including:
 Dayanara Rodriguez of Las Palmas was appointed as the replacement for the original winner, Ana Trujillo, who resigned from the title. Dayanara Rodriguez was the first runner-up of the Miss Grand Las Palmas 2022 pageant.
 Marta Rovira Mañé of Barcelona, who finished as the first runner-up at the provincial pageant, was appointed as the replacement for Eva Faife who withdrew for undisclosed reasons.

In the Province of Sevilla, at least two municipality pageants, such as Miss Grand Alcalá de Guadaíra and Miss Grand Capital, were held to determine the city's representative for the provincial pageant.

Regional preliminary pageants
The following is a list of the provinces that held the preliminary contests for Miss Grand Spain 2023.

Candidates
As of February 2023, 34 delegates have been confirmed to participate.

References

External links

 Miss Grand Spain official website

Grand Spain
Miss Grand Spain
Beauty pageants in Spain